Centerville is an unincorporated community and census-designated place (CDP) in Yell County, Arkansas, United States. It was first listed as a CDP in the 2020 census with a population of 283.

Centerville has a post office with ZIP code 72829.

Demographics

2020 census

Note: the US Census treats Hispanic/Latino as an ethnic category. This table excludes Latinos from the racial categories and assigns them to a separate category. Hispanics/Latinos can be of any race.

Education
Centerville is in the Two Rivers School District, which operates Two Rivers High School.

References

Census-designated places in Yell County, Arkansas
Census-designated places in Arkansas
Unincorporated communities in Yell County, Arkansas
Unincorporated communities in Arkansas